"True Love" is an episode of the American television series Dawson's Creek, which originally aired on The WB on May 24, 2000. The episode was directed by James Whitmore, Jr. and written by Tom Kapinos and Gina Fattore (teleplay), and Greg Berlanti and Jeffrey Stepakoff (story), though Fattore stated later that the episode was written "together as a group... we traded off on scenes." The episode is notable for having featured primetime television's first "passionate" kiss between two men - Jack and Ethan - which has been called "a milestone in the timeline of gay representation in pop culture". It is also notable for being the source of the meme known as 'Dawson Leery Crying' or 'Crying Dawson', as well as serving as a dramatic conclusion to the season three romantic story arc between Joey and Pacey.

See also
 Media portrayal of LGBT people

References

2000 American television episodes
2000 in LGBT history
Dawson's Creek
Television episodes set in Massachusetts